Mendelssohn-Bartholdy-Park is a Berlin U-Bahn station on line U2, located in the Tiergarten district at the border with Kreuzberg. Opened in 1998, the station is named after a small park east of the building, itself named in honor of the composer Felix Mendelssohn Bartholdy, commonly known as Felix Mendelssohn.

Though it is one of the newest stations on the U-Bahn, it is located on the first Stammstrecke line of 1902, where its northern branch crosses the Landwehr Canal on a viaduct and passes north through part of the Scandic Hotel before heading underground towards Potsdamer Platz. With the building of the Berlin Wall on 13 August 1961, train service was interrupted, and for a brief time in 1991 the tracks served for the experimental M-Bahn maglev line, stopping at Bernburger Straße station slightly to the north.

Following reunification, the M-Bahn was removed to allow the U2 to be reinstated. The line was reopened on 13 November 1993, but the station was not opened until 2 October 1998.

The station has disabled access, with lifts at the southern entrance.

References

External links

U2 (Berlin U-Bahn) stations
Buildings and structures in Mitte
Railway stations in Germany opened in 1998